William Horn (birthdate unknown) was an American baseball pitcher in the pre-Negro leagues. He played several years for Chicago teams like the Chicago Unions and Leland Giants. He also spent a couple of seasons with Iowa's Algona Brownies.

Horn played with several popular players of the day, including Bill Gatewood, Bruce Petway, Dangerfield Talbert, Henry W. Moore, Chappie Johnson, Albert Toney, George Hopkins, and Harry Hyde.

References

External links

Year of birth missing
Year of death missing
Place of birth missing
Place of death missing
Algona Brownies players
Chicago Unions players
Cuban Stars (West) players
Leland Giants players
Philadelphia Giants players